Nairo is a given name. Nairo may refer to:

Nairo Quintana (born 1990), Colombian cyclist
Nairo (gamer), the gamertag of American gamer Nairoby Quezada